Athis may refer to:

Athis, Honnelles, a village in the Honnelles municipality, Belgium 
Athis, Marne, a commune in the Marne département, France
Athis-Mons, a commune in the Essonne département, near Paris, France
Gué d'Athis, a fort near Fleury-sur-Orne
Athis (mythology), a character in Greek and Roman mythology 
Athis (moth), a genus of moths